Jean-Simon Leduc is a Canadian actor. He is most noted for his performances as Bruno in Love in the Time of Civil War (L'amour au temps de la guerre civile), for which he received a Quebec Cinema Award nomination for Best Supporting Actor at the 18th Quebec Cinema Awards, and as JP in the 2018 film Family First (Chien de garde), for which he received a Prix Iris nomination for Best Actor at the 20th Quebec Cinema Awards.

He has also appeared in the films Shambles (Maudite poutine), Worst Case, We Get Married (Et au pire, on se mariera), Genesis (Genèse) and In Broad Daylight (Au grand jour), and the television series Au secours de Béatrice, Terreur 404, Plan B and Fugueuse.

References

External links

21st-century Canadian male actors
Canadian male film actors
Canadian male television actors
French Quebecers
Male actors from Quebec
Living people
Year of birth missing (living people)